Ryan Botha (born 5 January 1981 in South Africa) is a South African retired footballer who now works as a model and trainer in his home country.

Career

Botha started his senior career with Stella. In 2001, he signed for Myllykosken Pallo −47 in the Finnish Veikkausliiga, where he made forty-two league appearances and scored ten goals.

References

External links 
 From Durban, to Jozi, to Oulu: How Ryan Botha carved a unique path to Europe 
 SA's Ryan is doing fine in Finland 
 Soccer star turned hero Ryan Botha back on his feet 
 Former SA International Turns Hero, Saves Life 
 Official Website

1981 births
Living people
South African soccer players
South African expatriate soccer players
Expatriate footballers in Finland
Expatriate footballers in Turkey
Association football wingers
Association football forwards
Denizlispor footballers
SuperSport United F.C. players
Jomo Cosmos F.C. players
Bidvest Wits F.C. players
Moroka Swallows F.C. players
Platinum Stars F.C. players
Vasco da Gama (South Africa) players
Myllykosken Pallo −47 players
FC Inter Turku players
Kokkolan Palloveikot players
Thanda Royal Zulu F.C. players